Nicolas Johnny Isimat-Mirin (born 15 November 1991) is a French professional footballer who plays as a central defender for Dutch club Vitesse.

Early career
Isimat-Mirin was born in Meudon, in the southwestern suburbs of Paris, to Guadeloupean parents. When he was six years old, his family moved to Roissy-en-Brie. Isimat-Mirin began his career at France at Roissy-en-Brie. During his time there, he became friends with Paul Pogba, Florentin Pogba and Mathias Pogba. Isimat-Mirin then moved to Clairefontaine football academy and is a graduate of football academy.

Club career

Valenciennes

After his departure from Clairefontaine, Isimat-Mirin joined Rennes and spent two seasons at the club before transferring to Valenciennes in 2009. He spent the 2009–10 season playing on the club's Championnat de France amateur 2 team. Isimat-Mirin's progress led to him being called up to Valenciennes’ first team, appearing as an unused substitute against Bordeaux on 28 April 2010.

At the start of the 2010–11 season, Isimat-Mirin appeared in the first team for the first time this season as an unused substitute against Auxerre on 21 August 2010. A month later, he was promoted to the first team by manager Philippe Montanier. On 21 September 2010, Isimat-Mirin made his professional debut in a Coupe de la Ligue match against Nîmes Olympique appearing as a substitute, as  Valenciennes won the match 5–4 on penalties. Five days later on 26 September 2010, he made his league debut for the club, as they lost 1–0 against Brest. On 19 October 2010, Isimat-Mirin signed his first professional contract agreeing to a three-year deal until July 2014. Following this, he made five more starts later in the 2010–11 season. In a match against Saint-Étienne on 3 April 2011, Isimat-Mirin was at fault when he conceded a goal from Dimitri Payet to score an equalising goal, in a 1–1 draw. At the end of the 2010–11 season, Isimat-Mirin went on to make thirteen appearances in all competitions.

At the start of the 2011–12 season, Isimat-Mirin established himself in the first team, playing in the centre–back position. His performance led to him signing a four–year contract extension with Valenciennes, keeping him until 2015. He then scored his first goal for the club, scoring from a header, in a 2–1 win against Auxerre on 20 November 2011. However in a match against Evian on 3 December 2011, Isimat-Mirin was sent–off in the 16th minute for a professional foul on Yannick Sagbo, as Valenciennes lost 2–1. After serving a one match suspension, he made his return to the starting line–up against Nice on 17 December 2011, as the club lost 2–0. Isimat-Mirin scored his second goal of the season, in a 2–0 win against Le Mans in the first round of the Coupe de France. However in a match against Bordeaux on 14 January 2012, he, once again, was sent–off for a second bookable offence, in a 2–1 loss. After serving a one match suspension, Isimat-Mirin returned to the starting line–up against Dijon on 4 February 2012 and helped Valenciennes win 2–1. Following his return from suspension, he continued to regain his first team place, playing in the centre–back position for the rest of the 2011–12 season. At the end of the 2011–12 season, Isimat-Mirin went on to make thirty–six appearances and scoring two times in all competitions.

Ahead of the 2012–13 season, Isimat-Mirin was linked a move away from Valenciennes, as he was linked a move away from the club. At one point, Ligue 1 side Lille agreed to sign the player but the move was broken down over the transfer price. Isimat-Mirin helped Valenciennes keep three clean sheets in the first three league matches of the season. Since the start of the 2012–13 season, he continued to establish himself in the first team, playing in the centre–back position. In the January transfer window, Isimat-Mirin was linked with a move to Paris Saint-Germain and Lille, whose 2.5 million euros was rejected by the club. He, once again, stayed at Valenciennes after his potential move to Lille never materialised. However, Isimat-Mirin suffered an eye injury that saw him miss two matches. He made his return to the starting line–up for Valenciennes against Toulouse on 23 February 2013 and helped the club keep a clean sheet, in a 0–0 draw. However in a match against Bastia on 30 March 2013, Isimat-Mirin suffered a knee injury and was substituted in the 63rd minute, as Valenciennes lost 4–3. Although he returned to the first team in late–April, he didn't make his return to the first team until on 18 May 2013 against Evian, starting the whole game, in a 2–0 loss. At the end of the 2012–13 season, Isimat-Mirin went on to make thirty–one appearances in all competitions.

AS Monaco
On 28 June 2013, Isimat-Mirin left Valenciennes to join the newly promoted Ligue 1 side AS Monaco on a four–year contract for a transfer fee costing 4 million euros. Upon joining the club, he said: "I am very happy to have landed here , he assures, with a smile on her face. Even though I know that there will be enormous competition for my position (Medjani, Abidal, Carvalho). But I am armed for this. Moreover, seeing such names and such recruits is somewhat reassuring because it proves that the club wants to give itself the means to achieve its ambitions."

Having appeared on the substitute bench for the next four months, Isimat-Mirin made his debut for AS Monaco, starting the whole game, in a 1–0 loss against Reims in the third round of the Coupe de la Ligue. A month later on 30 November 2013, he made his league debut for the club against Rennes, coming on as a 61st-minute substitute, in a 2–0 win. The beginning saw Isimat-Mirin received a number of first team starts, making a total of nine appearances. However, he struggled to regain his first team place, due to competitions in the centre–back positions.

Ahead of the 2014–15 season, Isimat-Mirin was linked a move away from Monaco, as Saint-Étienne was interested in signing him. The transfer move was agreed in early–August, but it was later broken down.

PSV Eindhoven

On 1 September 2014, it was announced that Isimat-Mirin was sent on loan to PSV Eindhoven until the end of the season.

Having appeared on the substitute bench, he made his debut for the club, starting the whole game, in a 2–0 win against Utrecht on 25 September 2014. After the match, Manager Phillip Cocu praised his performance, saying: "Isimat made a good impression. He mainly focused on his defensive tasks. He was tired, he was a bit tired, but well done." A month later on 18 October 2014, Isimat-Mirin made his league debut for PSV Eindhoven, starting the whole game and kept a clean sheet, in a 3–0 win against AZ Alkmaar. Since joining the club, he found his playing time, coming from the substitute bench. Isimat-Mirin said that once his loan spell at PSV Eindhoven ends, he will return to his parent club and fight for his first team place at AS Monaco. Following the absent of Jeffrey Bruma, Isimat-Mirin received a number of first team starts, playing in the centre–back position for the next seven matches. He scored his first goal for the club, scoring from a header, in what turned out to be a winning goal, in a 2–1 win against Groningen on 15 March 2015. After being dropped to the substitute bench following the return of Karim Rekik, Isimat-Mirin started in a match againstExcelsior on 25 April 2015 for the first time in the last four matches, but was sent–off for a second bookable offence, in a 3–2 win. After serving a one match suspension, he returned to the starting line–up  in the right–back position against ADO Den Haag and helped PSV Eindhoven win 3–2 in the last game of the season. His contributions to the season saw PSV Eindhoven win the league title for the first time since 2008 after beating SC Heerenveen 4–1 on 22 April 2015; it was the first major trophy of his professional career. At the end of the 2014–15 season, Isimat-Mirin went on to make twenty–five appearances and scoring once in all competitions. With the club wanted to keep him, it was announced on their website on 26 June 2015 that he signed a four-year contract on a permanent basis.

Ahead of the 2015–16 season, Isimat-Mirin retained his number two shirt for the PSV Eindhoven. His first game after signing for the club on a permanent basis came against FC Groningen in the Johan Cruijff Schaal, starting the whole game, as PSV Eindhoven won 3–0 to win the trophy. He contributed to the club's impressive winning starts that saw them at the top of the table. However, Isimat-Mirin found himself competing in a centre–back position and was dropped to the substitute bench as a result. By the second half of the season, his playing time increased and found himself rotated in and out of the starting line–up. Isimat-Mirin helped PSV Eindhoven keep three out of the five clean sheets in matches between 7 February 2016 and 5 March 2016. He, once again, helped the club keep three clean sheets in a row between 9 April 2016 and 19 April 2016. His contributions to the season saw PSV Eindhoven win the league for the second time in a row. At the end of the 2015–16 season, Isimat-Mirin went on to make twenty–six appearances in all competitions.

Ahead of the 2016–17 season, PSV Eindhoven's technical director Marcel Brands said that he's expecting Isimat-Mirin to receive first team football following the departure of Bruma. He started the season well, playing in the centre–back position against Feyenoord in the Johan Cruyff Shield and helped the club win 1–0 to win the trophy for the second time in a row. Isimat-Mirin helped PSV Eindhoven keep four clean sheets in four matches between 14 August 2016 and 10 September 2016. During which, he scored his first goal since joining the club on a permanent basis, in a 4–0 win against PEC Zwolle on 20 August 2016. In October 2016, Isimat-Marin found himself placed on the substitute bench for the next two matches, due to the competitions in the centre–backs. He made his return to the starting line–up against Bayern Munich in the UEFA Champions League match on 19 October 2016, coming on as a 61st-minute substitute, as PSV Eindhoven lost 4–1. This was followed up by keeping two clean sheets in the next two matches against Sparta Rotterdam and Vitesse. Between December and February, Isimat-Marin found himself rotated in and out of the starting line–up. Following this, he later regained his first team place for the rest of the 2016–17 season. Isimat-Marin then scored his second goal of the season, in a 5–0 win against Willem II on 9 April 2017. He later helped the club finish third place in the league, ending their two seasons defence. At the end of the 2016–17 season, Isimat-Marin went on to make thirty–seven appearances in all competitions.

Ahead of the 2017–18 season, Isimat-Marin was linked a move away from PSV Eindhoven, as clubs, such as, 1899 Hoffenheim and Nice were interested in signing him. But he announced his intention to stay at the club. At the start of the 2017–18 season, Isimat-Marin helped the club got off the winning start, resulting in the team at the top of the table. He then helped PSV Eindhoven go on a ten consecutive victories in a row between 17 September 2017 and 3 December 2017. During which, Isimat-Marin scored the only goal of the game, in a 1–0 win against PEC Zwolle on 19 November 2017. He then scored his second goal of the season, scoring the club's fourth goal of the game, in a 4–1 win against VVV-Venlo in the last 16 of the KNVB Cup. Since the start of the 2017–18 season, Isimat-Marin continued to establish himself in the starting line–up, playing in the centre–back position. He helped PSV Eindhoven keep three clean sheets in three matches between 27 January 2018 and 7 February 2018. His performance saw him being named the league's Team of the Month for February. He started in the centre–back position on 15 April 2018, as the club beat rivals Ajax 3–0 to clinch the Eredivise title. At the end of the 2017–18 season, Isimat-Marin went on to make thirty–seven appearances and scoring two times in all competitions.

Ahead of the 2018–19 season, Isimat-Mirin was told by the new manager Mark van Bommel that he can leave the club after being deemed surplus of requirement. As a result, Isimat-Mirin found his first team opportunities limited, appearing a number of matches on the substitute bench. Despite this, he scored his goal of the season, in a 4–0 win against Excelsior Maassluis in the first round of the KNVB Beker. However because of lack of first team opportunities, manager van Bommel expected the player to leave PSV Eindhoven in the January transfer window. By the time Isimat-Mirin left the club in January, he made six appearances and scoring once in all competitions.

Beşiktaş
On 6 January 2019, Isimat-Mirin signed for Beşiktaş, signing a three and a half year contract. Upon joining the club, he said: "I believe it is the right choice I have made. I will do my best to represent the colors of this club."

Isimat-Mirin made his debut for Beşiktaş, starting the whole game and kept a clean sheet, in a 3–0 win against Akhisarspor on 18 January 2019. However in a follow–up match against BB Erzurumspor on 25 January 2019, he suffered a waist injury that saw him substituted at half time. But Isimat-Mirin made a quick recovery and returned to the starting line–up against Antalyaspor on 3 February 2019, as the club won 6–2. He regained his first team place by starting in the next three matches. However, Isimat-Mirin suffered an injury during a match against Fenerbahçe on 25 February 2019 and was out for several weeks. It wasn't until on 8 April 2019 when he made his return to the starting line–up against Çaykur Rizespor and helped Beşiktaş win 7–2. Following this, Isimat-Mirin helped the club finish third place in the league. At the end of the 2018–19 season, he went on to make fourteen appearances in all competitions.

Ahead of the 2019–20 season, Isimat-Mirin was told by the Beşiktaş’ management that he can leave the club following his disappointment performance. As a result, Beşiktaş were planning to sell him, with Göztepe and Amiens were among interested. Following his loan spell at Toulouse ended, Isimat-Mirin continued to be linked a move away from the club, as Zulte Waregem and Hatayspor were interested in signing him. But he announced his intention to return to Beşiktaş ahead of the 2020–21 season. However, the club said that Isimat-Mirin were among four players left out of the squad. The contract between Beşiktaş and the player was mutually terminated on 1 February 2021.

Toulouse (loan)

On 21 August 2019, Isimat-Mirin was loaned out to French outfit Toulouse for the 2019–20 season.

Having appeared in the substitute bench for the next three matches since joining the club, he made his Toulouse debut against Nîmes Olympique on 21 September 2019 and started the whole game, in a 1–0 loss. Since joining the club, Isimat-Mirin quickly established himself in the starting eleven, playing in the centre–back position. On 7 December 2019, he scored his first goal for Toulouse, scoring the opening goal of the game, in a 4–2 loss against RC Strasbourg. After missing one match due to suspension, Isimat-Mirin returned to the starting line–up against Lyon in the last 16 of the Coupe de la Ligue, as the club lost 4–1 on 18 December 2019. However, he was sidelined for a month after suffering an injury earlier this year. Isimat-Mirin returned to the starting line–up against Lille on 22 February 2020, as Toulouse lost 3–0. However, his return was short–lived when the LFP elected to end the season early due to the coronavirus pandemic, resulting in the club's relegation. Having made sixteen appearances and scoring once in all competitions for Toulouse, Isimat-Mirin returned to his parent club.

Sporting Kansas City
A couple days later, Isimat-Mirin signed a two-year contract with Major League Soccer side Sporting Kansas City. Upon joining the club, he was given a number five shirt. Following the 2022 season, his contract option was declined by Kansas City.

Vitesse
In January 2023 Isimat-Mirin signed a contract with Vitesse until the end of the 2023–24 season.

International career
Isimat-Mirin is eligible to play for Guadeloupe through his parents. He later said it would be a "pride for him to try to represent the Guadeloupe colors".

In May 2011, Isimat-Mirin was called up to the France U20 for the first time. He made his U20 national team debut, starting the whole game, in a 4–1 win against Mexico U20 on 2 June 2011. Isimat-Mirin went on to make five appearances for France U20 side.

In August 2011, Isimat-Mirin was called up to the France U21 squad for the first time. He made his U21 national team debut, starting the whole game, in a 1–0 win against Portugal U21 on 5 September 2011. Isimat-Mirin later made two more appearances for France U21 side.

Personal life
Isimat-Mirin dismissed rumors that his family came from Haiti. Isimat-Mirin is second youngest of family, as he has four brothers and one sister. His mother worked as a carer for elderly people with mental problems, while his father worked "at the town hall of Paris". Isimat-Mirin spoke fondly about his father, acknowledging his admiration of him and credited him for pushing him. In April 2019, he became a first time father when his wife Kimberly Mirin, gave birth to a baby girl named Azaya.

Isimat-Mirin said about his music career, saying: "I had a lot of positive reactions and even recorded the song in a music studio. It was a nice joke and a nice memory of the previous season, but we are now starting a new season. That is what I concentrate completely on. I am a football player, not a singer. And I am looking forward to starting again." In addition to speaking French, he speaks English, Dutch and Spanish.

Honours
PSV Eindhoven
Eredivisie: 2014–15, 2015–16, 2017–18
Johan Cruyff Shield: 2015, 2016

References

External links
 
 
 
 
 
 

1991 births
Living people
People from Meudon
Footballers from Hauts-de-Seine
Association football defenders
French footballers
France youth international footballers
France under-21 international footballers
Valenciennes FC players
AS Monaco FC players
PSV Eindhoven players
Beşiktaş J.K. footballers
Toulouse FC players
Sporting Kansas City players
SBV Vitesse players
Ligue 1 players
Eredivisie players
Süper Lig players
French expatriate footballers
Expatriate footballers in the Netherlands
Expatriate footballers in Turkey
French expatriate sportspeople in the Netherlands
French expatriate sportspeople in Turkey
French people of Guadeloupean descent
Major League Soccer players